"Curl of the Burl" is a single by American heavy metal band Mastodon from their fifth studio album, The Hunter. It was released August 16, 2011, as the second single from the album. The single was the band's most successful song on the Mainstream Rock Songs chart at release, peaking at No. 15. It would eventually lose its title to Emperor of Sands "Show Yourself". It was nominated for a 2011 Grammy award in the category Best Hard Rock/Metal Performance.

Music video
A music video was produced for the song and was directed by Roboshobo. The video was uploaded to the band's official YouTube account on September 20, 2011. The video focuses on a man (played by Bill Oberst Jr.) who chops down a tree carrying a warning sign, snorts a rough powder made of its wood, and becomes intoxicated. He grows an extra set of arms. The man keeps snorting the powder to the point that he is transformed into an archetypal lumberjack.  He proceeds to stomp through the woods felling trees and encounters a group of women.  The women strip him and reveal he is a log and set him on fire.

Charts

Personnel
Brann Dailor – drums, lead vocals
Troy Sanders – bass guitar, lead vocals 
Brent Hinds – guitar, lead vocals 
Bill Kelliher – guitar

References

Mastodon (band) songs
2011 singles
Reprise Records singles
Roadrunner Records singles
Song recordings produced by Mike Elizondo
2011 songs